The Belper Knolle ("Belp Ball") is a Swiss cheese made in the city of Belp, Switzerland.

Made from unpasteurized cow's milk, it can be found in two variants, red or gold depending on its degree of maturation, fresh or dry. A fresh Belper Knolle can be heated to 60 °C and softened in a sort of square-shaped stone before consumption.

References

Cow's-milk cheeses
Swiss cheeses